John Hand may refer to:

 John Hand (rower) (born 1902), Canadian Olympic rower
 John Hand (priest) (1807–1846), Irish priest who founded All Hallows College, Dublin

See also
 Jon Hand (born 1963), former American football player